Greatest Hits: 2001–2009 is a compilation album by the Greek singer Despina Vandi, released in 2009 by her previous record label Heaven Music in Greece and Cyprus, after Vandi announced her departure from the label.

The album has hits from the span of her career at the label and was released as a standard single disc edition with 16 hits and a deluxe double disc and bonus DVD edition with 32 hits and 27 music videos.

Track listing

Release history

Credits and personnel

Personnel
Giorgos Alkaios - music, lyrics
Boss - lyrics
Freeman - lyrics
Natalia Germanou - lyrics
Nikos Halkousis - remix
Kostas Kapetanidis - director
Vasilis Karras - vocals
Giorgos Mazonakis - vocals
Thanos Petrelis - vocals
Phoebus - music, lyrics
Raith - lyrics
Reith - lyrics
Giannis Rentoumis - lyrics
Nikos Soulis - director
Despina Vandi - vocals
Christopher von Deylen - music, lyrics

Production
Thodoris Hrisanthopoulos - mastering

Design
C. Avgoulis - photo
Branco - photo
C. Coutayar - photo
H. Karatzolas - photo
G. Lalas - photo
Greg Mandas - DVD authoring
Giannis Sarlis - art direction, design
T. Vrettos - photo

Credits adapted from the album's liner notes.

References

External links
 Official site

2009 greatest hits albums
Albums produced by Phoebus (songwriter)
Despina Vandi compilation albums
Greek-language albums
Heaven Music compilation albums